Elena Clara Antonia Carrara Spinelli (13 March 1814, in Bergamo – 13 July 1886, in Milan) was an Italian woman of letters and backer of the Risorgimento, usually known by her married name of countess Clara Maffei or Chiarina Maffei.

Life
At 17 years old she married Andrea Maffei, but they separated by mutual consent on 15 June 1846. She had a long and lasting relationship with Carlo Tenca.

She is well known for the salon she hosted in via dei Tre Monasteri in Milan, known as the "".  Starting in 1834 and organised by Tommaso Grossi and Massimo d'Azeglio, it attracted several well-known literati, artists, scholars, composers and pro-Risorgimento figures to meet to discuss art and literature.  These included Alessandro Manzoni, Francesco Hayez (who painted a portrait of Clara which he then gave to her husband), Giuseppe Verdi and Giovanni Prati.

Bibliography

Barbiera, Raffaello, Il salotto della contessa Maffei, Milano, Treves 1895 (new edition)
Cunigi, Davide, "Una gentildonna bergamasca del Risorgimento. La contessa Clara Maffei", in Rivista di Bergamo, XX, February 1941, pp. 49–53, and March 1941, pp. 74–78
Monti, Antonio, Una passione romantica dell'Ottocento. Clara Maffei e Carlo Tenca, Milano, Garzanti 1940

External links

Raffaello Barbiera, Il salotto della contessa Maffei, Milano, Treves, 1895
www.url.it
Article on Clara Maffei in Corriere

1814 births
1886 deaths
People from Bergamo
Countesses
Deaths from meningitis
Neurological disease deaths in Lombardy
Infectious disease deaths in Lombardy
Italian salon-holders
Italian people of the Italian unification
Nobility from Milan
19th-century Italian women